Anna is a 1964 Indian Malayalam-language film, directed K. S. Sethumadhavan. The film stars Sathyan, Ragini, T. R. Saroja and Kottarakkara Sridharan Nair. The film had musical score by G. Devarajan.

Cast
 
Sathyan 
Ragini as Anna 
Sukumari 
T. R. Omana 
T. R. Saroja
P. .K Rajam
Adoor Pankajam 
Kalyanikkutty
Kottarakkara Sreedharan Nair 
Kottayam Chellappan 
Kuthiravattam Pappu 
S. P. Pillai 
Johnson

Soundtrack
The music was composed by G. Devarajan and the lyrics were written by Vayalar Ramavarma.

References

External links
 

1964 films
1960s Malayalam-language films
Films directed by K. S. Sethumadhavan